Louis DeWitt Hale (June 10, 1917 – February 20, 2018) was an American politician. He served as a Democratic member in the Texas House of Representatives from 1953 to 1978 and 1939 to 1940. He served as Speaker pro tempore from 1961 to 1962. Hale served in the United States Army Air Forces during World War II. From 1975 to 1978, he was Dean of the Texas House.

References

1917 births
2018 deaths
People from Corpus Christi, Texas
People from Hunt County, Texas
United States Army Air Forces soldiers
Military personnel from Texas
University of Texas alumni
Texas lawyers
Democratic Party members of the Texas House of Representatives
American centenarians
Men centenarians
20th-century American lawyers